Hendrick Hamel (1630 – 1692) was a Westerner to provide a first hand account of Joseon Korea. After spending thirteen years there, he wrote "Hamel's Journal and a Description of the Kingdom of Korea, 1653-1666," which was subsequently published in 1668.

Hendrick Hamel was born in Gorinchem, Netherlands. In 1650, he sailed to the Dutch East Indies where he found work as a bookkeeper with the Dutch East India Company (VOC). In 1653, while sailing to Japan on the ship “De Sperwer” (The Sparrowhawk), Hamel and thirty-five other crewmates survived a deadly shipwreck on Jeju Island in South Korea.  After spending close to a year on Jeju in the custody of the local prefect, the men were taken to Seoul, the capital of Joseon Korea, in June, 1655, where King Hyojong (r. 1649 to 1659) was on the throne.  As was customary treatment of foreigners at the time, the government forbade Hamel and his crew from leaving the country. During their stay, however, they were given freedom to live relatively normal lives in Korean society

In September 1666, after thirteen years in Korea, Hamel and seven of his crewmates managed to escape to Japan where the Dutch operated a small trade mission on an artificial island in the Nagasaki harbor called Dejima. It was during his time in Nagasaki (September 1666 to October 1667) that Hamel wrote his account of his time in Korea. From here, Hamel and his crew left to Batavia (modern day Jakarta) in the Dutch East Indies in late 1667.  Although Hamel sojourned in Batavia until 1670, experts speculate that his crew, returning to the Netherlands in 1667, brought his manuscript with them, where three versions of it were published in 1668. Hamel himself did not return to the Netherlands until 1670.

Time in Joseon Korea

Jeju Island 
On Jeju Island, the sudden appearance of thirty-six Europeans created no small stir among the Korean inhabitants. On August 21, four days after the shipwreck, Hamel and his crew were taken to Jeju city, upon which the local prefect, Yi Wonjin, sent an announcement to the king in Seoul, describing the event of the shipwreck and requesting advice on how to deal with the Dutchmen. In October of the same year, the local government brought Jan Janse Weltevree (Korean name “Park-Yeon”), a Dutchman who himself had become shipwrecked on Korea 27 years prior, to converse with Hamel and his crew. With the help of Weltevree, the Dutchmen formed a positive relationship with Yi Wonjin. 

Several months into their stay on Jeju, Yi Wonjin was replaced by a new prefect, who was cruel to Hamel and his crew. Soon after the new prefect replaced Yi Wonjin, he received a response to Yi Wonjin's announcement that had been sent to the Joseon court months earlier.  Although the announcement dismissed any chance of the crew's release, it declared that the Korean government had “a moral obligation to ease their existence,” It also called for the castaways to be sent to Seoul.

Seoul 
Once Hamel and his crew arrived in Seoul, they were taken before king Hyojong With the help of Jan Jansz Weltevree, they begged the king to release them so they could return home to their wives and children.  The king denied their request, citing official policy.  The king then asked the Dutchmen to entertain him with song and dance from their home country.

During their two years in Seoul, Hamel and his crew served in the king's guard. They lived in a complex administered by Korean landlords and, in addition to their duties in the king's guard, performed domestic chores for their landlords. Outside of these duties, Hamel and his crew were permitted to live relatively normal lives.

Jeolla Province 
In 1656, two of Hamel's crew caused a disturbance when they ambushed a Manchu envoy on its way to Seoul and begged the Manchu officials to help them escape. Because of this, and mounting pressure to dispose of the Dutchmen, in 1657, King Hyojong banished Hamel and his crew to a military garrison in Jeolla Province on the Southwest corner of the peninsula.

Life in Jeolla Province was relatively normal. During the seven years Hamel and his crew stayed there, they acquired “houses, households and gardens, all nicely set up after the customs of the country.”   Much of their well-being and comfort depended on the attitude of the commandant in charge.  Some commandants were crueler than others, burdening Hamel and his crew with extra duties.   At one point, Hamel and his crew resorted to begging, a vocation they actually found rewarding since, as foreigners, they had no trouble drawing a large crowd. At least one of these men founded the Byeongyeong Nam clan.

Escape to Japan 
Because of a famine that cursed the region from 1659 to 1663, Korean officials at the garrison decided to divide the burden of hosting the Dutchmen between three different areas. Of the twenty-two Dutchmen still alive, five went to Suncheon, five went to Namwon, and twelve, including Hamel, went to the headquarters of the Left Provincial Naval District, near modern-day Yeosu.

Situated on the water, Hamel and the group at the naval district quickly recognized they were in an excellent position to escape. Down to eight from the original twelve, the group slowly gathered supplies and negotiated the purchase of a small fishing boat from a local Korean.  On September 4, 1666, an especially dark day with good tidal conditions, the men left their compound, loaded their boat, and headed out to sea. Four days later, Japanese boats found Hamel and his crew near the Goto island chain.

After communicating with the Koreans about the situation and running into some diplomatic complications, the Japanese were finally able to return Hamel and his crew to Deshima, the Dutch trade mission at Nagasaki. During the negotiations, per Hamel's request, the Japanese inquired about the remaining crewmen in Korea. Two years later, the Japanese secured their release as well.

During his time in Nagasaki (September 1666 to October 1667) Hamel wrote his account of his time in Korea.  From here, Hamel and his crew left to Batavia (modern day Jakarta) in the Dutch East Indies in late 1667. Although his crew continued on to the Netherlands in 1668, Hamel himself stayed in Batavia until 1670 trying, in vain, to secure fourteen years of back salary from the Dutch East India Company.   Once his crew returned to the Netherlands, experts believe they had three versions of Hamel's original manuscript published.

Dutch recognition of Hamel

Back in 17th century Holland, Hamel was just another of the many former VOC crewmen with many adventurous stories to tell.  He had sailed the Seven Seas at a time when dozens of VOC ships plied their trade, fought sea battles, survived disasters, made discoveries and enjoyed adventures. Unsurprisingly, the events described in his journal were regarded as a mere curiosity.

Only recently has Hamel's hometown acknowledged his role as an explorer. In a major move to pay homage to its famous traveler, the old fortress town of Gorinchem now boasts a statue of Hamel. A second, similar casting was added to the Hamel monument in the South Korean town of Gangjin. The first public recognition of Hamel in the Netherlands occurred early in the 20th century, when a local street was named after him. The street still exists.

See also
Gregorio Céspedes
Jan Jansz. Weltevree
Hermit Kingdom
Dutch East Indies
Dutch Formosa
Dejima
Byeongyeong Nam clan

References

 Corea, Without and Within, Hendrick Hamel's narrative of captivity and travels in Corea, annotated, by William Elliot Griffis, Philadelphia: Presbyterian Board of Publication, 1885.
 Coree-Korea 1653-1666 (Itineraria Asiatica: Korea), Hendrik Hamel, Orchid Press, Thailand, ASIN 9748299481, 1981.

External links
 
 
 http://henny-savenije.pe.kr/index.html
 http://henny-savenije.pe.kr/index-4.htm

1630 births
1692 deaths
People from Gorinchem
History of Korea
Dutch journalists
Dutch Golden Age writers
Sailors on ships of the Dutch East India Company
17th-century Dutch explorers
Jeju Province
Dutch expatriates in Korea
Dutch East India Company people